Gerhard Maria Wagner (born 17 July 1954, Wartberg ob der Aist, Austria) is an Austrian Roman Catholic priest. He was appointed auxiliary bishop of Linz by Pope Benedict XVI on 31 January 2009, but amidst controversy over his views that sin caused Hurricane Katrina, Wagner turned the post down on 15 February 2009.

Ordained ministry
On 10 October 1978, Wagner was ordained to the priesthood of the Roman Catholic Church by Cardinal László Lékai, Archbishop of Esztergom. Since 1988, he has been parish priest of Windischgarsten, Upper Austria in the Diocese of Linz.

Episcopal appointment
On 31 January 2009, Wagner was appointed auxiliary bishop of Linz, Austria, by Pope Benedict XVI.  Amidst controversy over his views, Wagner resigned on 15 February 2009.

Wagner's appointment as auxiliary bishop was met with controversy among Austrian Roman Catholics, with Linz Diocese Bishop Ludwig Schwarz supportive, an informal group of priests led by Upper Austria church dean Franz Wild opposed, and Graz-Seckau Diocese Bishop Egon Kapellari optimistic that the "crisis" would be overcome by "good will" from both supporters and opponents.

Two weeks after his appointment Wagner requested its revocation because of the widespread criticism. In those 2 weeks the number of people leaving the Church had quadrupled in his Linz congregation, with similar or even higher numbers in the neighbouring communities, many of the ex-parishioners naming Wagner's appointment as the reason for their departure. The Times-Picayune reported Wagner's announcement in an Associated Press article concluding with a comparison between the Wagner situation and that surrounding the Holy See's decision to lift the excommunication of the bishops of the Society of St. Pius X, particularly Holocaust-denier Richard Williamson. The Vatican formally accepted the resignation and dispensed Wagner from his appointment on 2 March 2009.

Views
Wagner alleged that the Harry Potter novels partake of satanism.

Wagner became widely known in the world press for his 2005 comment attributing Hurricane Katrina to God's ire toward the sins of New Orleans.  James Gill, columnist for the New Orleans Times-Picayune, satirically called for the Pope next to elevate Wagner as Archbishop of New Orleans after protests from Roman Catholics in three New Orleans congregations over the merging of their churches by aging Archbishop Alfred Clifton Hughes.  The churches had been depopulated in part by out-migration resulting from Hurricane Katrina.  Indeed, two months after Gill's writing, Hughes was engaged in encouraging the University of Notre Dame to disembark from plans to host President Barack Obama, a supporter of abortion, as commencement speaker, and within days of Hughes' announcement of opposition to Obama's appearance the Times-Picayune published a letter to the editor urging that Hughes should instead have complained to the Pope about the short-lived appointment of Wagner to be auxiliary bishop of Linz.

References

1954 births
20th-century Austrian Roman Catholic priests
Living people
Pope Benedict XVI
People from Freistadt District
21st-century Austrian Roman Catholic priests
Religious controversies in Austria